Catch My Soul. A live recording of the original cast was recorded with the original UK cast of Jack Good's Catch My Soul-The Rock Othello. It featured the rock band Gass who had been the house band for the UK stage production.

The album was made in conjunction with Jack Good Productions who brought in vocal and musical arrangers Emil Dean Zoghby, John Bennett and Phil Kenzie. The album was recorded over several days at The Birmingham Repertory Theatre using the Pye mobile studio and was produced by Peter Knight.

Track listing
Side one
 "Goats And Monkeys'" (performed by Gass)
 "Wedding Chant" (performed by Emil Dean Zoghby)
 "Ballad Of Catch My Soul" (performed by Lance LeGault)
 "Drunk" performed by (P.J. Proby)
 "If Wives Do Fall" (performed by Dorothy Vernon)
 "Cannikins" (performed by Lance LeGault)

Side two
"Put Out The Light" (performed by Robert Tench)
"You Told A Lie" (performed by Dorothy Vernon and Lance LeGault)
"Very Well-Go To" (performed by Jeffry Wickham and Lance LeGault)
"Willow" (performed by Sharon Gurney)
"Seven Days And Night" (performed by P.P. Arnold and P.J. Proby)
"Why" performed by (Jack Good)
"Black On White" (performed by P. P. Arnold, P.J. Proby and Robert Tench)
"Death Chant" (performed by Emil Dean Zoghby)

Album sleeve
The album sleeve stated: "Jack Good Production Ltd & Theatre Projects Associates Ltd presents the '69 Theatre Company production of Jack Good's Catch My Soul-The Rock Othello". Jack Good, the producer of the show, wrote:

Credits
The original cast and Gass (UK stage version)
Producer - Peter Knight for Jack Good Productions Ltd
Vocal arrangements - Emil Dean Zoghby.
Musical arrangements - John Bennett and Phil Kenzie.
Pye Studios mobile recording - Vic Maile and Alan Florence.
Photographs - Flair Photography.
Inner sleeve design - Graphreaks.
Cover design - Russell James Associates.

Notes

References 
Hjort, Chris and Hinman, Doug. Jeff's book : A chronology of Jeff Beck's Career 1965-1980 : from the Yardbirds to Jazz-Rock. Rock 'n' Roll Research Press, (2000). 
Joynson, Vernon. The Tapestry of Delights - The Comprehensive Guide to British Music of the Beat, R&B, Psychedelic and Progressive Eras 1963-1976. Borderline (2006). Reprinted (2008). 
Morley, Sheridan. Green, Donald Edward. Jensen, Donald Edward. Review copies: plays and players in London, 1970-74. Robson Books (1974). Digitized (9 Feb 2007).

External links
[ Jack Good] at Allmusic

PP Arnold official website

Cast recordings